Sumatera Institute of Technology (Indonesian: Institut Teknologi Sumatera, abbreviated as ITERA) is a public university in South Lampung, Lampung, Indonesia.

ITERA has three faculties and 35 programs, all of them at the undergraduate level.

History 
ITERA was founded in 2014 as part of the implementation of the Master Plan for Acceleration and Expansion on Indonesia's Economic Development (Indonesian: Masterplan Percepatan dan Perluasan Pembangunan Ekonomi Indonesia) or MP3EI. 

ITERA was created to increase the number of Indonesian STEM graduates  To ensure the quality of its program, ITERA had also entered a 10-year partnership with Bandung Institute of Technology.

Academics

Faculties 
The following are the programs available in ITERA:

Faculty of Infrastructure and Territorial Technology 

 Urban and Regional Planning
 Civil Engineering
 Geomatics Engineering
 Architecture
 Environmental Engineering
 Ocean Engineering
 Landscape Architecture
 Visual Communication Design
 Railway Engineering

Faculty of Science 

 Mathematics
 Physics
 Chemistry
 Biology
 Atmospheric and Planetary Science
 Pharmacy
 Actuarial Science
 Data Science
 Marine Environmental Science

Faculty of Industrial and Production Technology 

 Electrical Engineering
 Geophysics Engineering
 Informatics Engineering
 Machine Engineering
 Industrial Engineering
 Geological Engineering
 Energy Systems Engineering
 Chemical Engineering
 Physics Engineering
 Material Engineering
 Telecommunications Engineering
 Mining Engineering
 Food Technology
 Agricultural Industry Technology
 Biosystem Engineering
 Forestry Engineering
 Biomedical Engineering

Ranking 
ITERA was ranked as the 134th best university in Indonesia according to Webometrics’ 2021 report.

References 

Universities in Indonesia